Lagao (lit: Ascription / Attachment) is a Pakistani romantic drama serial, which was aired on Hum TV on January 18, 2016. Written by Waseem Ahmad, it is directed by Ali Masud Saeed and produced by Momina Duraid. It stars Saniya Shamshad, Babar Khan, Zainab Qayyum, Maryam Fatima, Saman Ansari, Attiya Khan, Shamim Hilaly, Mehmood Aslam and Adnan Jaffar with along others.

Lagaao, a story of love, trust, and friendship turns into a tale of lies, deceit, and remorse. Watch the story unfold.

Synopsis 
Lagao is the story of three friends: Nyla (Zainab Qayyum), Amber (Attiya Khan) and Sitwat (Saman Ansari). Nyla is married to Abeer (Adnan Jaffar) and Amber is married to Rana (Mehmood Aslam). Amber has a daughter Sumbul (Sania Shamshad) and Nyla has a daughter Maham (Maryam Fatima). However, Sumbul doesn't support her cruel father who is a sharp man. Once Rana is assassinated, she expresses that she didn't want the death of her father but she wanted him to cancel his harsh policies. She loved Farhan (Babar Khan) but her father said her to marry his friend's son which she refused. Nyla sees Abeer more attached with Amber as he also considers Amber as his friend and wants to marry her as when Sumbul calls he comes at that time without letting his wife know. Sitwat hasn't married but secretly wants Abeer. Finally, Maha also refuses to consider him as her father. There comes Amber's paternal aunt (Shamim Hilaly). Amber's paternal aunt comes in Amber's house and wants that Amber must marry again with another man. She first try to marry Amber with Abeer which actually didn't know that he has married to Nyla. Maham also stopped talking with Sumbul prior that she had always liked Abeer to help Amber and matry her. However, distance between Nyla and Abeer increased as Nyla saw Abeer and Amber in restaurant. Nyla tried to divorce Abeer and until she lived with her eldest brother. However, Nyla and Amber's relation came under strain and was braked, same with Sumbul and Maham. Sitwat became happy as she was said by Nyla that she make divorce papers. On otherside, Amber had a factory problem, which she said to Abeer to solve, she solved but it was all written in newspapers. Amber tried the best to hide this from Sumbul. Sumbul had already this file on computer. Sumbul became happy as somebody is with them. Sumbul and Amber's aunt want that Amber must marry Abeer. Sitwat died in a car accident before Amber and Abeer's marriage. Sitwat and her closest nephew  were closely related. Sitwat's nephew liked Sitwat as he thought she was right in her actions. Abeer divorced Nyla but not signed (as seem by Nyla). Nyla didn't see sign and go to her friend Sumera's home for living rest of her life. Sumera suggested her to do a second marriage. Nyla became happy as she hadn't got divorce yet and she is still Abeer's wife. Nyala decided to come Pakistan and live together. Amber decided to live with Sumbul prior to (Shamim Hilaly)'s departure to her original home. Abeer now lived with his old family. Safdar Rana (Taimoor Rana's brother, Sumbul's paternal uncle) suddenly come to take Sumbul as she was his niece. Amber protected Sumbul, Safdar and Army gone away. But he said that he will come again.

 Purpose  It is the drama showing how the Sitwat and Amber like same man (Nyla's husband Abeer).

Cast
 Saniya Shamshad as Sumbul (Antagonist)
 Babar Khan as Farhan (Antagonist) 
 Maryam Fatima as Maham (Antagonist) 
 Zainab Qayyum as Nyla (Protagonist)
 Saman Ansari as Sitwat (Protagonist) - Episode #15
 Attiya Khan as Amber (Protagonist) (Sumbul's mother) (Taimoor Rana's 2nd wife)
 Adnan Jaffar as Abeer (Protagonist)
 Humaira Ali as Nadra (Taimoor Rana's 1st wife) (Guest appearance)
 Mehmood Aslam as Rana (Sumbul's father) (Guest appearance) - Episode #1
 Ali Abbas as Emmad
 Shamim Hilaly as Chachi Bi (Amber's paternal uncle's wife)
 Munawwar Saeed as Safdar Rana (Taimoor Rana's brother, Sumbul's paternal uncle and taya)
 Farah Nadeem as Najma (Farhan's mother)
 Mahi Baloch as Ashmara (Imaad's first cousin)
 Hamza Bajwa
 Sofia Khan

See also
 2016 in Pakistani television 
 List of programs broadcast by Hum TV

References

External links
 

Hum TV
Hum Network Limited
Hum TV original programming
Pakistani romantic drama television series
Television series by MD Productions
MD Productions
Television series created by Momina Duraid
Pakistani telenovelas
Urdu-language television shows
2016 Pakistani television series debuts
2016 Pakistani television series endings